The Codex 429 of Ravenna’s Classense Library, attributed to the half of the tenth century, is the most ancient medieval manuscript that preserves the eleven comedies of Aristophanes.

The codex arrived in the West in 1423, through the agency of Giovanni Aurispa, who saved this and many other precious manuscripts from the imminent fall of Constantinople, taking them to Florence, to the humanist Niccolò de' Niccoli. In 1516 Bernardo Giunta used it for the first printed edition of Lysistrata and Thesmophoriazusae; the traces of the manuscript were lost until 1712, when the abbot Pietro Canneti found it at last in Pisa and brought it to Ravenna, in the library of the Monastery of Classe.

Notes

Aristophanes
Greek manuscripts
Ravenna